Nijat is an Azerbaijani male given name that may refer to
Nijat Abasov (born 1995), Azerbaijani chess player
Nidjat Mamedov (born 1985), Azerbaijani chess player 
Nijat Rahimov (born 1993), Azerbaijani-Kazakhstani weightlifter 
Nijat Shikhalizade (born 1988), Azerbaijani judoka

Azerbaijani masculine given names